The 1945–46 Oklahoma A&M Aggies men's basketball team represented Oklahoma A&M College, now known as Oklahoma State University, in NCAA competition in the 1945–46 season. The Aggies won their second consecutive NCAA championship, defeating the North Carolina Tar Heels by a score of 43–40 in the championship game of the NCAA Tournament. Oklahoma A&M was also retroactively named the national champion by the Helms Athletic Foundation and the Premo-Porretta Power Poll.

NCAA tournament

West Region
 Oklahoma A&M 44, Baylor 29
Final Four
 Oklahoma A&M 52, California 35
Finals
 Oklahoma A&M 43, North Carolina 40

Notes and references

Oklahoma AandM
Oklahoma State Cowboys basketball seasons
Oklahoma AandM
NCAA Division I men's basketball tournament Final Four seasons
NCAA Division I men's basketball tournament championship seasons
Oklahoma AandM Aggies men's b
Oklahoma AandM Aggies men's b